The Little Terror is a 1917 American silent drama film directed by Rex Ingram and starring Violet Mersereau, Sidney Mason and Ned Finley.

Cast
 Violet Mersereau as Tina and Alice
 Sidney Mason as George Reynolds
 Ned Finley as John Saunders
 Robert Clugston as Wallace Saunders
 Ed Porter as The Manager
 John Raymond as Archibald Watkins 
 Mathilde Brundage as Mrs. Watkins

References

Bibliography
 Robert B. Connelly. The Silents: Silent Feature Films, 1910-36, Volume 40, Issue 2. December Press, 1998.

External links
 

1917 films
1917 drama films
1910s English-language films
American silent feature films
Silent American drama films
American black-and-white films
Universal Pictures films
Films directed by Rex Ingram
1910s American films